The New York Cosmos were an American soccer club based in New York. The side was originally created in 1971 by brothers Ahmet and Nesuhi Ertegun, with the support of Warner Brothers president Steve Ross. The new team entered the North American Soccer League (NASL), which was in its fourth season. Bankrolled by parent company Warner Communications, the Cosmos became the NASL's most successful side, winning a record five championships in front of the league's largest crowds. The team included international stars signed from European and South American clubs, including Brazilians Pelé and Carlos Alberto, West German Franz Beckenbauer, Italian striker Giorgio Chinaglia and many others.

When the team was sold to a Chinaglia-owned consortium in 1983, the Cosmos' financial resources were reduced dramatically; the majority of the team's key players were sold as a result. As a result, game performance declined.  The Cosmos entered the Major Indoor Soccer League for the 1984–85 indoor season, but left mid-year after disappointing gates. After the NASL folded in March 1985, owners attempted to operate the team independently, but the team was dissolved later that year. A new incarnation of the Cosmos, formed in 2010, made its debut in the new North American Soccer League during the 2013 season.

List of seasons

Key to regular season record
Conf = Conference
Div = Division
G = Games played
W = Games won
T = Games tied
L = Games lost
F = Goals for
A = Goals against
Pts = Points
GB = Games behind
% = Percentage of possible points won from wins and ties
Pos = Final regular season position

Key to leagues, conferences, divisions and cups
NASL = North American Soccer League
MISL = Major Indoor Soccer League
TC = Trans-Atlantic Challenge Cup
Atl = Atlantic Conference
Nat = National Conference
Am = American Conference
N = Northern Division
E = Eastern Division

Key to play-off rounds and Trans-Atlantic Cup
R1 = First round
SF = Semi-finals
DRU = Division runners-up
CRU = Conference runners-up
RU = Runners-up
C = Champions
A "minigame" is equivalent to Extra time.

Key to scorers
 Gls = Number of goals scored
 Pts = Number of points scored
  Players with this background and symbol in the "Name" column scored a record number of points for the club during the corresponding season. This does not include indoor seasons.

Seasons

Outdoor

Indoor
In the winter of 1975, the NASL organized a two-tiered, 16 team indoor tournament with four regional winners meeting in a "final-four" style championship. The New York Cosmos won their region at the Rochester War Memorial Arena by virtue of a tie-breaker, but lost both the semi-final and the third-place matches at the Cow Palace to Tampa Bay and Dallas respectively.

Footnotes

A.  The "top scorer" given is the top scorer of points. Goals scored two points, and assists one. These figures include the regular season only.
B.  Starting in 1975, tied games were decided by a shootout.
C.  The NASL's indoor seasons used the games behind system rather than points to rank the teams. The 1983–84 indoor season counted both goals and assists as one point.
D.  The Cosmos did not enter an indoor league for the 1982–83 season.
E.  The Cosmos pulled out of the Major Indoor Soccer League (MISL) after 33 games, citing low attendances. The MISL also used the games behind system, and ranked both goals and assists as one point.

NASL scoring system
Until 1974, the NASL scored thus:
6 points for a win
3 points for a tie
0 points for a loss
1 point per goal for up to three goals scored per game
After 1974, the system changed to the following:
6 points for a win
1 point for a win after a shootout (following a tie in regulation time)
0 points for a loss or shootout loss
1 point per goal for up to three goals scored per game

Indoor soccer
Indoor soccer features six players per team as opposed to the standard eleven, and is played without an offside rule on an artificial field of play. The pitch is far smaller than that used in regular soccer, with a regulation size of 200 feet by 85 feet, identical to a North American ice hockey rink. The goals and penalty areas are also scaled down. Instead of two halves of 45 minutes each, matches are divided into four quarters of 15 minutes.

Play-off scores
a.  Lost to Atlanta, 0–2
b.  Defeated St. Louis, 2–1
c.  Lost to Dallas, 0–1
e.  Lost to Tampa Bay, 1–3
f.  Defeated Seattle, 2–1
g.  Defeated Tampa Bay, 3–1
h.  Lost to Vancouver, 0–2, 3–2, 0–1 (minigame, shootout)
i.  Defeated Fort Lauderdale, 3–0
k.  Lost to Chicago, 0–1 (shootout)
m.  Defeated Seattle, 1–0
o.  Lost to Montreal, 2–4, 0–1 (shootout)
r.  Lost to San Diego, 0–3

Top scorers
d.  Joey Fink scored 11 goals in 1973, but a lack of assists meant that his points total of 22 came behind Randy Horton's total of 23.
s.  Stan Terlecki scored the most goals for New York during the 1983–84 season with 34, but his points tally of 57 fell short of Chico Borja's 66.

Trans-Atlantic Challenge Cup
j.  Finished first out of New York, Vancouver, Manchester City (England) and A.S. Roma (Italy)
l.  Finished second out of Seattle, New York, Celtic (Scotland) and Southampton (England)
n.  Finished second out of Chicago, New York, S.S.C. Napoli (Italy) and Club Nacional de Football (Uruguay)
p.  Finished first out of New York, AC Fiorentina (Italy), Seattle and São Paulo FC (Brazil)
q.  Finished first out of New York, Udinese (Italy), FC Barcelona (Spain) and Fluminense (Brazil)

References
Bibliography

General
Background sourced to: Newsham (2006).
NASL statistics sourced to: 
Top scorers sourced to: 
MISL statistics sourced to: 
Trans-Atlantic Cup statistics sourced to: 
Notes

 
New York Cosmos
New York Cosmos